Barbora Havlíčková (born 12 May 2000) is a Czech cross-country skier. She competed in the women's 15 kilometre skiathlon at the 2018 Winter Olympics.

Cross-country skiing results
All results are sourced from the International Ski Federation (FIS).

Olympic Games

World Championships

World Cup

Season standings

References

External links
 

2000 births
Living people
Czech female cross-country skiers
Olympic cross-country skiers of the Czech Republic
Cross-country skiers at the 2018 Winter Olympics
Place of birth missing (living people)
Cross-country skiers at the 2016 Winter Youth Olympics